Roven is a surname. Notable people with the surname include:

Charles Roven (born 1949), American film producer
Glen Roven (1958–2018), American composer, lyricist, conductor, and producer

See also
René Grillet de Roven, French instrument and watch maker
Ronen
Rosen